"BBO (Bad Bitches Only)" is a song by American hip hop group Migos featuring rapper 21 Savage. It was released on January 26, 2018 from Migos' second studio album Culture II. The song was produced by Buddah Bless, Kanye West, DJ Durel, Quavo and Mike Dean.

Composition
The song contains gospel elements from "You've Got the Makings of a Lover" by the Festivals, a horn instrumental and "futuristic synth blips". 21 Savage opens the song with the chorus, in which he raps about his "iced-out" watches, chain and necklace.

Critical reception
The song was met with generally positive reviews. Jackson Howard of Pitchfork praised the song's production and the influence from Kanye West. In addition, he wrote that "Despite the usual flurry of inventive Migos quotables and opulent brags — Offset says that he's "living the wild life like Tarzan," while Takeoff taunts, "I say Phillipe [sic]/You say 'fill-up'" — no verse steals the show, and sandwiched in between 21's hook, the three members slip into a comfortable back and forth." Rob Arcand of Spin wrote the song "accentuates each rapper's strongest qualities" and that "While 21's hook remains the most penetrating, it's hard to argue that there's ever a weak moment among the four verses. On an album that's otherwise  full hit-or-miss ideas, 'BBO' stands out as the tightest package of the Migos formula from start to finish." Trevor Smith of HotNewHipHop wrote, "the beat is incredibly dynamic, allowing each member to take drastically different directions with their verses and let their personalities shine through".

Uproxx called it the 44th best track of 2018.

Charts

Certifications

References

2018 songs
Migos songs
21 Savage songs
Songs written by Quavo
Songs written by Offset (rapper)
Songs written by Takeoff (rapper)
Songs written by 21 Savage
Songs written by Kanye West
Songs written by Mike Dean (record producer)
Songs written by Buddah Bless
Song recordings produced by Buddah Bless
Song recordings produced by Kanye West
Song recordings produced by Mike Dean (record producer)